Cerro del Bolsón is a mountain in the Aconquija Range of Argentina, in Tucumán province. It is the highest point of a significant eastern spur of the main range of the Andes, east of the Puna de Atacama region. It lies about 200 kilometres east of Ojos del Salado, the highest point in the Puna de Atacama.

While not of great height compared to the 6000 metre-plus peaks of the main chain of the Andes to the west, Bolsón is notable for its high topographic prominence (it ranks 69th in the world), resulting from its separation from the main chain by a relatively low saddle.

See also
 List of Ultras of South America

References

External links
 "Cerro Bolsón de los Cerillos, Argentina" on Peakbagger

Bolson, Cerro del
Landforms of Tucumán Province
Sierras Pampeanas